Cupressus bakeri, reclassified as Hesperocyparis bakeri, with the common names  Baker cypress, Modoc cypress, or Siskiyou cypress, is a rare species of cypress tree endemic to a small area across far northern California and extreme southwestern Oregon, in the western United States.

Description

The bark is thin, red when young, and gray in maturity.

The foliage grows in sparse, very fragrant, usually pendulous sprays, varying from dull gray-green to glaucous blue-green in color. The leaves are scale-like, 2–5 millimeters long, and produced on rounded (not flattened) shoots.

The male cones are 3–5 mm long, and release pollen in February–March.

Distribution and habitat
The tree grows in limited populations in southwestern Oregon's Josephine and Jackson counties, and slightly more populously in a small section of Northern California within Siskiyou, Modoc, Shasta, Plumas and Tehama counties. It is probably the northernmost cypress.

This includes locales in the Modoc Plateau, southern Cascade Range, Klamath Mountains, and northern Sierra Nevada. It is slow-growing in the wild, and is mostly restricted to sites difficult for plant growth, on serpentine soils and on old lava flows. Its tolerance of these sites enables it to avoid competition from much faster-growing trees. It is found in chaparral and yellow pine forest habitats.

Ecology
The tree's thin bark makes it susceptible to wildfire, exposure to which is required to release the seeds; these then colonize the scorched earth left behind. Fire suppression policies of the past decades have severely limited reproduction of the species. It is listed as a vulnerable species on the IUCN Red List.

See also

List of plants on the Modoc National Forest
Milo Samuel Baker

References

External links
CalFlora Database: Hesperocyparis bakeri (Baker's cypress) 
Jepson Manual eFlora (JM2) treatment of Hesperocyparis bakeri
USDA Plants Profile for Hesperocyparis bakeri (Modoc cypress)
Gymnosperm Database: Cupressus bakeri
photo of herbarium specimen at Missouri Botanical Garden, collected in 1934 in Siskiyou County, California
UC Calphotos Photos Gallery: Hesperocyparis bakeri 

bakeri
Flora of California
Flora of Oregon
Endemic flora of the United States
Trees of the Northwestern United States
Trees of the Southwestern United States
Flora of the Cascade Range
Flora of the Klamath Mountains
Natural history of the California chaparral and woodlands
~
~
~
Plants described in 1909
Taxa named by Willis Linn Jepson